Adriano Tilgher may refer to:
 Adriano Tilgher (philosopher) (1887–1941), Italian relativist philosopher
 Adriano Tilgher (politician) (born 1947), Italian far-right activist